Fury at Furnace Creek  is a 1948 American Western film directed by H. Bruce Humberstone and starring Victor Mature, Coleen Gray, Glenn Langan, and Reginald Gardiner.

Plot
Troops are massacred at a Furnace Creek fort in 1880 after an army captain, Walsh, cites orders forcing him to abandon a wagon train. Apache Indians hid inside the wagons to gain access to the fort.

General Blackwell is blamed for the incident and court-martialed. Denying that he sent any such order, the general has a stroke and dies on the witness stand. No written evidence of the order is presented.

One of his sons, Rufe, a captain from West Point, travels west to find out what happened. His brother, Cash, reads of their father's death in a Kansas City newspaper and also heads toward Furnace Creek in search of answers.

Using an alias, Cash learns that Capt. Walsh has become a drunkard. A mining boss, Leverett, is impressed by the stranger in town and hires him, not knowing Cash's real name or intent. Rufe arrives in town and also assumes a false identity.

Cafe waitress Molly Baxter, whose father was killed at the fort, still considers General Blackwell the man to blame. But the real villain is Leverett, who bribed Walsh and organized the Apache raid. A guilty conscience causes Walsh to write a confession. Leverett sends one of his henchmen to do away with Walsh, but the confession is found by Cash.

Rufe is framed, arrested and tried, but escapes. Cash gives him the confession and tells him to take it to the Army as proof. Wounded in a gunfight with Leverett but victorious, Cash recovers and reads in the paper about the proof of General Blackwell's innocence.

Cast

 Victor Mature as Cash Blackwell
 Coleen Gray as Molly Baxter
 Glenn Langan as Rufe Blackwell
 Reginald Gardiner as Captain Walsh
 Albert Dekker as Leverett
 Fred Clark as Bird
 Charles Kemper as Peaceful Jones
 Robert Warwick as Gen. Fletcher Blackwell
 George Cleveland as Judge
 Roy Roberts as Al Shanks
 Willard Robertson as Gen. Leads
 Griff Barnett as Appleby
 Jay Silverheels as Little Dog

Production
The film was originally called Ballad at Furnace Creek. Shooting took place near Kanab, Utah, specifically, in Zion National Park. Virgin River, Springdale Johnson Canyon, Utah, as well as on the Arizona Strip. Victor Mature's role was originally meant to be played by John Payne.

References

External links
 

1948 films
1940s historical films
1948 Western (genre) films
20th Century Fox films
American historical films
American Western (genre) films
Films directed by H. Bruce Humberstone
Films shot in Utah
Films shot in Arizona
Films set in Arizona
American black-and-white films
1940s English-language films
1940s American films